Charles Francis Rice (April 4, 1851 – October 2, 1927) was a prominent minister and author. He was a member of the New England Conference of the Methodist Episcopal Church for 50 years, serving as a District Superintendent for five years and as President of the Massachusetts Federation of Churches for 10 years.

Early life and education
He was born April 14, 1851 in the parsonage of the Walnut Street Church in Chelsea, Massachusetts, the third son of the Reverend William Rice and Caroline Laura North. He attended Springfield High School in Springfield, Massachusetts and Wesleyan University, graduating as Salutatorian in 1872. He was a member of the Eclectic Society, and Phi Beta Kappa. He received an A.M. in 1875 and a D.D. degree from Wesleyan in 1893.
The Wesleyan archives have his journals in which he describes his college experiences during the early 1870s.

Career

Teaching
He taught classics at both Springfield High School (1872–73) and Wesleyan University (1874–77). In 1874, he worked in the Springfield City Library. 
While a faculty member at Wesleyan, he served on the committee on the Annual Examination and the committee on the Olin Prize. He also served as President of the General Alumni Association. His father William Rice was a trustee, and his brother William North Rice was a professor and an acting president of Wesleyan.

Ministry
Rev. C. F. Rice was licensed as a member of the New England Conference of the Methodist Episcopal Church in 1873. He served as pastor at the following churches:
 Appleton Church, Neponset, Boston, Massachusetts (1877–80) 
 Wesley Chapel, Salem, Massachusetts (1880–83) 
 Methodist Church, Webster, Massachusetts (1883–85)
 St. Paul's Church, Lowell, Massachusetts (1885–88) 
 Methodist Church, Leominster, Massachusetts (1888-93)
 Epworth Methodist Episcopal Church, Cambridge, Massachusetts (1893–98).
 St. Luke's Church, Springfield, Massachusetts (1898-00)
 Wesley Church, Springfield, Massachusetts (1900–05)
 District Superintendent, Cambridge, Massachusetts (1905-10) 
 Winthrop Street Church, Boston, Massachusetts (1911-15)
 South Street Methodist Church, Lynn, Massachusetts (1916-20)
 Wellington Church, Medford, Massachusetts (1921-25)

He was noted for serving the Wellington Church after his retirement, until his death in 1927.

Boards and Committee work
He was an incoming trustee of the New England Methodist Conference in 1902, and dealt with the results of unwise investments, which had cost the church thousands of dollars. 
He was a delegate to the General Conference of the Methodist Episcopal Church in 1904 in Los Angeles  and 1908 in Baltimore, the Inter-church Conference on Federation in 1905, the Federal Council of Churches of Christ in America, 1912, 1916 and 1920. 

He served as President of the Massachusetts Federation of Churches from 1911-1921. In 1922, the federation honored his service in a special ceremony at King's Chapel. Speakers included his brother, Rev. Dr. William North Rice, president of the Connecticut Federation, and Lt. Governor Alvan T. Fuller. 

Rice was President of the Lynn Inter-church Union from 1918-1919. He was also director of the Federation of Churches and Religious Organizations of Greater Boston. He was also chairman of the Conference Board Exam from 1897-1905, President of the New England Educational Society, President of the New England Conference Board of Stewards, and a member of the Board of Education of the M.E. Church from 1908-12. He was also Chairman of the Board of Managers of the New England Deaconess Association.

Other work
He wrote History of Methodism in Webster, Massachusetts, printed in the Webster Times in 1884. He hosted Methodist students from Harvard University in the 'Oxford Club' and presented a paper entitled Life in the Epworth Rectory in 1894. Also in 1894, he delivered the Baccalaureate Sermon for Lasell Seminary in the Auburndale Congregational Church. Part of his speech read:  

He also served on the visiting committee of the Boston University School of Theology, delivering communion at its Matriculation in 1905. Some of his sermons from Boston University chapel services are included in Noontime Messages in a College Chapel: Sixty-nine short addresses to Young People by Twenty-five Well-known Preachers, printed 1917.

He was a trustee at Wilbraham Wesleyan Academy and succeeded his father as President of its Board of Trustees from 1898-1912. He was a Republican, and a member of the Twentieth Century Club. He served as Secretary for a Boston Wesleyan alumni group, and as secretary for the class of 1872. In 1916, he was listed as a donor to the Massachusetts Society for the Prevention of Cruelty to Children.

Family life
He married Miriam Owen Jacobs (1863-1901) on August 25, 1875. She was the daughter of Dr. Horace Jacobs and Emily Owen Jacobs. She was educated in the Springfield public schools, and graduated with honors from Vassar College in 1874.

Together, they had five children; Laura Owen Rice, William Chauncey Rice, Horace Jacobs Rice, Paul North Rice, and Rachel Caroline Rice. All three sons attended Wesleyan University. Laura Owen Rice attended Vassar College, and Rachel Caroline Rice attended Boston University. After graduating from Wesleyan in 1901, William Chauncey Rice received an A.M in Government from Yale in 1902. He then studied at Harvard, where he earned a law degree in 1908, and later wrote a dissertation on the decline of the Federalist Party in New England in 1912. Horace Jacobs Rice also graduated from Harvard Law School in 1908. Both were admitted to the bar and practiced law in Boston and Springfield respectively. Paul North Rice graduated from the New York Library School and became a notable librarian at the New York Public Library.
Laura Owen Rice married The Rev. Dr. William Grant Seaman, who served as minister of the City Methodist Church in Gary, Indiana and as the president of Dakota Wesleyan University. Rachel Caroline Rice married Burton Howard Camp, who was a longtime mathematics professor at Wesleyan University.

The New York Times lists Rev. C. F. Rice and his brother Professor William North Rice as having sailed to Liverpool on the Cunard Line ship, SS Bothnia, and returned on the SS Catalonia in 1881. C. F. Rice presented a sketch of his European trip at a meeting of the Essex Institute, in 1882.

In 1898 with William North Rice, he co-authored and published William Rice: A Memorial, a book about their father the Rev. William Rice.

In 1904, he and Laura O. Rice were listed as being at Camp Curry, at Yosemite in The San Francisco Call. 

On January 10, 1914, Rice hosted his son in law, Rev. William Grant Seaman, who preached at Winthrop Street Methodist Episcopal Church in Roxbury.

He died in 1927 at his home in Medford. His funeral was held at the Copley Methodist Church in Boston, and he was buried with family members in the Springfield Cemetery.

Genealogy
Charles Francis Rice was a direct descendant of Edmund Rice, an English immigrant to Massachusetts Bay Colony, as follows:

 Charles Francis Rice, son of
 William Rice (1821–1897), son of
 William Rice (1788–1863), son of
 Nathan Rice (1760–1838), son of
 John Rice (1704–1771), son of
 Ephraim Rice (1665–1732), son of
 Thomas Rice (1625–1681), son of
 Edmund Rice (1594–1663)

References

External links
 
"Popcorn and Walnut Burn" blog post about Rice's diary
EPWORTH'S NEW PASTOR. Cambridge Tribune, Volume XVI, Number 7, 22 April 1893

Methodist ministers
Writers from Chelsea, Massachusetts
1851 births
1927 deaths
Wesleyan University alumni
People from Boston